Karger Publishers (also: Karger Medical and Scientific Publishers, S. Karger AG) is an academic publisher of scientific and medical journals and books. The current CEO is Daniel Ebneter.

History
The company was founded in 1890 in Berlin by Samuel Karger, who remained at the helm of the company until his death in 1935. His son, Heinz Karger led the company until his death in 1959, and Heinz's son (and Samuel's grandson) Thomas Karger took over the leadership of the company; he was followed as the company leader by his eldest son, Steven Karger, and, most recently, by his youngest daughter, Gabriella Karger, who leads the publishing house now. Its first medical journal, Dermatologische Zeitschrift (later: Dermatologica, now: Dermatology) was established in 1893. The company published works from well-known scientists such as Sigmund Freud. Because of political pressure from the Nazi regime, the company was relocated to Basel, Switzerland, in 1937 and lost all German authors and editors. This led to a more international focus and most journal titles were changed from German to Latin and articles were now published in either German, English, French, or Italian. The company currently publishes over 80 journals, and over 40-book series.

Journals 
Journals published by Karger include:

 Annals of Nutrition and Metabolism
 Brain, Behavior and Evolution
 Cardiology
 Cells Tissues Organs
 Cerebrovascular Diseases
 Chemotherapy
 Cytogenetic and Genome Research
 Dermatology
 European Addiction Research
 European Neurology
 Folia Primatologica
 Gerontology
 Hormone Research in Paediatrics
 Intervirology
 Neonatology
 Neuroepidemiology
 Neuropsychobiology
 Ophthalmic Research
 Phonetica
 Psychopathology
 Psychotherapy and Psychosomatics
 Research in Complementary Medicine
 Skin Pharmacology and Physiology

Further reading

References

External links
 

Academic publishing companies
Publishing companies established in 1890
Publishing companies of Switzerland
Companies based in Basel
German companies established in 1890